The Norwegian Bandy Premier League  is the top level of bandy in Norway. National bandy champions have been named yearly since 1912, but the league was only founded in 1932.

The league consists of eight teams. After the regular league, the leading teams goes to a play-off which decides what team will be the Norwegian champion. Since 1976, the winner of the league is formally awarded the title league champion (Norwegian: seriemester), a title which however is not counted to be worth as much as the national championship title. Stabæk Idrettsforening won the final in 2016.

Structure
All the eight teams plays the other teams three times during a season. At the end of the season, each team will have played 21 matches.

The teams are ranked according to the following:

 Number of points (two for win, one for draw, nill for loss).
 The results against each other.
 Goal difference.
 Number of goals scored.

The two bottom teams play a qualification round against the two top teams in the second highest division. The two teams which win the qualification round will play in the premier league in the next season.

League Champions since 1976

Norwegian Champions

The six top teams go to play-off for the national championship. Teams 3 and 4 in the table play against team 5 or 6. The winners of these matches meet team 1 and 2 in semifinals. The winners of the semifinals meet in the national championship final.

References

Bandy competitions in Norway
1932 establishments in Norway
Bandy
National bandy leagues
Sports leagues established in 1932